Bhogilal Pandya (1904-1981) was a freedom fighter and social worker from Dungarpur in the Indian state of Rajasthan. On 3 April 1976, the Government of India awarded him the Padma Bhushan for his social services. The Padma Bhushan is the third-highest civilian award in the Republic of India, given for distinguished service to the nation. For his championing of education and rights for the poor and underprivileged, he is referred by the people of Rajasthan as "Gandhi of Vahgad". His home is in the Gandhi aashram area of Dungarpur.

In 1938, Pandya was elected President of Seva-sangh, an organisation that engages in community service in the Dungarpur, Udaipur, Jaipur and Jaisalmar regions of Rajasthan. Through this organisation, Pandya provided community leadership and championed the cause for education of poor village students and gaining rights for and improving the lives of the depressed tribal Bhil people. After India gained its independence in 1948, Pandya was appointed to ministerial positions in the State government. Between 1948 and 1956 he was industrial minister and minister of temples. Between 1969 and 1977, he held the post of Chairman of Khadi Board of Rajasthan.

Bohgilal Pandya was born in Simalwara village of Dungarpur district, Rajasthan on 13 November 1904. His father's name was Pitamber Pandya and his mother's name was Nathibai Pandya. Pandya was married to Maniben in 1920 in Nanawada village of Malpur district of Sabarkantha in Gujarat. The couple had three sons and two daughters.

Bohgilal Pandya died on 31 March 1981 at the age 77. The Government of Rajasthan named Dungarpur government college as Bhogilal Pandya Government College in his memory.

References 

Indian independence activists from Rajasthan
Recipients of the Padma Bhushan in social work
Rajasthani people
People from Dungarpur district
1904 births
1981 deaths
Social workers
20th-century Indian educational theorists
Social workers from Rajasthan
India MPs 1957–1962
Lok Sabha members from Rajasthan
People from Banswara district